Eric Prentice Anchor Thake (8 June 1904 – 3 November 1982) was an Australian artist, designer, painter, printmaker and war artist.

His 1972 Christmas card An Opera House in Every Home, a humorous take on Jørn Utzon's World Heritage-listed building is a well-known work.

Early life 
Thake was born in Auburn, Melbourne, on 8 June 1904, the only child of Emily Lockwood (née Doran) and Henry Thake, dairyman. Educated at Auburn Primary School, at age fourteen at the end of WW1 he was apprenticed to a process engraving firm Patterson Shugg. He enrolled in 1921 at the Drawing School of the National Gallery of Victoria under traditionalist painter W. B. McInnes, then went on to study painting and drawing part-time with the modernist Melbourne artist George Bell from 1925 to 1928. In 1935 he married 1935 Grace Bessie Doris Godfrey.

Career 
From June 1930 Thake showed with 'The Embryos,' a group that included Raymond Lindsay, a son of Norman Lindsay, Constance Parkin then the holder of the National Gallery Travelling Scholarship), Margaret Crombie, Shiela Hawkins, James Flett, Herbert McClintock, and Nutter Buzzacott; and in the Contemporary Group, Melbourne with George Bell, Daryl Lindsay, Isabel May Tweddle, Evelyn Syme, Ada May Plante, Arnold Shore, William Frater and Adrian Lawlor from 1932–38, and with the Contemporary Art Society from 1926–56 and concurrently, he worked in commercial art as art director for the advertising firm Paton until 1956, producing work for clients including Pelaco shirts. Independently he produced linocuts which conveyed his laconic wit in clever visual puns; including bookplates and many Christmas cards he produced for friends; numbers of which are held now in national collections.

He was a war artist enlisted as a Flying officer in the Royal Australian Air Force (Service Number 145552) between 24 Nov 1943 and 28 Mar 1946, the second such R.A.A.F combatant artist commissioned during World War II and his two tours of duty covered Port Moresby, Noemfoor Island, Morotai, Alice Springs, Darwin and Koepang. During that time he produced Surrealist works as one of the first working in that style in Australia, alongside James Gleeson with whom he shared 1931 the Contemporary Art Society prize. His 1942 oil painting Brownout sold in 2010 for $228,000.

His first solo exhibition was held after the war at Georges Gallery, Melbourne in 1947.

After the War Thake returned to Paton and was featured in advertising by one a major client as No. 5 in Shell's "Australian Artists" Series, with a depiction of their refinery in Clyde. By 1960 his work included illustratons for the Australian quarterly Manuscripts, design works included the Australian Pavilion at the Wellington Centennial Exhibition in New Zealand that opened on 8 November 1939 at the outset of the Second World War covers for the literary journal Meanjin, designs for stamps, and concise medical diagrams he produced in the course of his employment from 1956 in the University of Melbourne’s Visual Aids Department where he remained  until his retirement.

Reception 
Thake's work started being reviewed from June 1930 when he was twenty-six and had started exhibiting with the group calling themselves 'The Embryos.' Reviewing their show at The Little Gallery in Melbourne The Age notes that "Eric Thake follows up the new wood engraving movement, and... also shows a clever two-block lino print, Reurned Empty and a decorative lunette design in color." While The Australasian merely noted that his fan design was "very clever," reviewer for The Herald, Blamire Young, singled Thake out for particular attention for his "power of design";It is surprising that Eric Thake, whose power of design has been so universally recognised has not secured more patrons. Probably the reason is that his point of view is more difficult to grasp than that of his comrades.

Legacy 
McCulloch notes that "his sensitivity towards the dispossession of Aboriginal people in his works in particular has been brought to light since his death, and there has been a growing interest in his wonderful Christmas card linocuts, produced from 1941 to 1975.

The National Gallery of Victoria held a retrospective of his work 15 May–4 July  1970.

Exhibitions

Solo 

 1947: Georges Gallery, Melbourne
 1981: Pubs and Bars, Geelong Art Gallery
 1981: Retrospective exhibition, Victorian Ministry for the Arts Gallery

Group 
 1929, 6–20 May: Society of Artists' Special Exhibition. David Jones' Art Gallery, 7th floor (Mezzanine), Elizabeth Street, Sydney
 1929, 7 September–4 October: Society of Artists' Annual Exhibition. Education Department Gallery, 5th floor, Loftus St., Sydney
 1930, 5 September–2 October: Society of Artists' Annual Exhibition. Education Department Gallery, 5th floor, Loftus St., Sydney
 1930, 1–12 July: The Embryos, opened by Bernard Heinze. The Little Gallery, 172 Little Collins Street, Melbourne.
 1930, October: Victorian Arts and Crafts. Melbourne Town Hall
 1935, Contemporary Art Group, Athenaeum, Melbourne
 1935, November: Contemporary Art with Mary Cecil Allen, Lady Barrett, George Bell, Rupert Bunny, Mrs. Casey (wife of the Commonwealth Treasurer), William Frater, Adrian Lawlor, Lionel Lindsay, Daryl Lindsay, Ada May Plante, Arnold Shore, Eric Thake, Louise Thomas, and Jessie C. Traill. Geelong Grammar
 1935, September: with Kate Van Sommers and Adrian Lawlor. Collegiate Galleries, 357 Little Collins St., Melbourne 
 1946, June: R.A.A.F. Paintings. National Gallery of Victoria
 1978: Survey of Australian Relief Prints 1900-1950, Deutscher Gallery

Posthumous 
 1988-9: The Great Australian Art Exhibition, Art Gallery of South Australia travelling exhibition, Queensland Art Gallery [2]. (17 May 1988 – 17 July 1988); Art Gallery of Western Australia. (13 August 1988 – 25 September 1988); Art Gallery Of South Australia. (23 May 1989 – 16 July 1989)
 1992: Classical Modernism: The George Bell Circle, National Gallery of Victoria
 2000-02: Federation: Australian Art and Society, National Gallery of Australia and touring
 2002: Christmas Greetings from Thake's Flat, IPMA
 2003: Australian Surrealism: The Agapitos/Wilson Collection, Art Gallery of Western Australia
 2005: Retrospective. Geelong Art Gallery
 2005: Bookplates from the Corrigan Collection, Bendigo Art Gallery
 2005, to 8 July: Linocuts, drawings and photographs. Bridget McDonnell Gallery, 130 Faraday Street, Carlton

Awards 

 1931: Honorable Mention, Los Angeles Bookplate Exhibition, USA
 1931: Contemporary Art Society prize (shared with James Gleeson),
 1941: Geelong prize,
 1947: Yorick Club prize,
 1956; Cato Prize, VAS

Collections 
 National Gallery of Australia
 Art Gallery of New South Wales
 Art Gallery of South Australia
 Art Gallery of Western Australia
 National Gallery of Victoria
 Queensland Art Gallery
 Tasmanian Museum and Art Gallery
 Australian War Memorial
 State Library of Victoria
 State Library of New South Wales 
 Art Gallery of Ballarat
 Bendigo Art Gallery
 Castlemaine Art Museum
 Geelong Art Gallery
 Horsham Regional Art Gallery
 Mornington Peninsular Regional Gallery
 Newcastle Art Gallery
 Deakin University
 La Trobe University
 University of Adelaide Library
 University of Melbourne

References

External links
Eric Thake at the State Library of Victoria
Eric Thake at the Australian War Memorial
Eric Thake in the Australian Dictionary of Biography

1904 births
1982 deaths
Artists from Melbourne
Australian surrealist artists
20th-century Australian painters
20th-century Australian male artists
Australian male painters
Australian photographers
Australian printmakers
Australian graphic designers
Engravers by nationality